Campobello di Mazara is a town in  the province of Trapani, Sicily, southern Italy.
 
Its inhabitants are scattered in the town center and the minor seaside frazioni of Tre Fontane and Torretta Granitola, populated mostly during the summer period. It borders on the neighbouring cities of Mazara del Vallo and Castelvetrano, and is colloquially known just as Campobello.

History 
Campus Belli is the name given by the Romans to the place where the battle between Segesta and Selinunte took place, the name later extended to the town.

Near the town lies Rocche di Cusa, the ancient quarries from which the Selinuntines extracted stone to build temples.

Campobello di Mazara was founded in 1623 by Giuseppe di Napoli, who in 1630 was given it as a dukedom.

In January 2023 it was revealed that the Mafia most-wanted boss Matteo Messina Denaro was living in the city at the time of his arrest, on January 16th.

Main sights
Cave di Cusa
Ducal Palace
The Clocktower. About 27 m high, it overlooks the town.
Mother Church of Santa Maria delle Grazie
Palazzo Accardi

Economy
The town is an agricultural center and is known thanks to its production of olives and wine plantations.

Cultivated fields, mainly olive groves and vines, characterize the landscape of Campobello di Mazara.

References

External links

Official website

Municipalities of the Province of Trapani
1623 establishments in Italy